This is a list of notable individuals who have been romantically or maritally coupled with a first cousin. Worldwide, more than 10% of marriages are between first or second cousins.  Cousin marriage is an important topic in anthropology and alliance theory.

Notable people

A
Edwin Abbott, English educator, and his first cousin, Jane Abbott
Samuel Abravanel, Sephardic-Italian financier, and his first cousin, Benvenida Abrabanel
Abu al-As ibn al-Rabi', son-in-law and Companion of Muhammad, and his first cousin Zainab bint Muhammad
Julius Adam, German painter, and his first cousin, Amalie Adam
John Adams II (1803–1834), American government functionary and businessman, and his first cousin, Mary Catherine Hellen
Pedro Aguirre Cerda, Chilean president, and his first cousin, Juana Rosa Aguirre
Ali ibn Husayn Zayn al-Abidin (c. 659 – c. 713), grandson of Ali ibn Abi Talib, and his first cousin, Fatimah bint Hasan
Mark Antony and his first cousin, Antonia Hybrida Minor

B
Josiah Bartlett (1729–1795), second signer of the United States Declaration of Independence, and his first cousin, Mary Bartlett
Sir Rowland Blennerhassett, 1st Baronet and his first cousin, Millicent Agnes Yielding
Ilsley Boone (1879–1968) and his first cousin, Ella Murray "Mae" Boone, founder of the American Sunbathing Association, which today is known as the American Association for Nude Recreation
James Boswell (1740–95) (biographer of Samuel Johnson) and his first cousin Margaret Montgomerie married in 1769.
Christine Boutin (b. 1944), French politician and her first cousin, Louis Boutin
Wernher von Braun (1912–1977) and his first cousin, Maria Luise von Quistorp
Charles Bulfinch (1763–1844), American architect, and his first cousin, Hannah Apthorp

C
George Cayley, British cricketer, and his first cousin, Catherine Louisa Worsley
Quintus Caecilius Metellus Celer and his first cousin, Clodia
Fuad Char, Colombian politician, and his first cousin, Adela Chaljub Char
Burwell Colbert, freed American slave, and his first cousin, Critta Hemings
Henry Nelson Coleridge (1798–1843) and his first cousin, Sara Coleridge

D
Charles Darwin and his first cousin, Emma Wedgwood. Their respective siblings Caroline Darwin and Josiah Wedgwood III (1795–1880), entrepreneur, also married.
Pierre S. du Pont (1870–1954), American businessman and philanthropist, married his first cousin, Alice Belin, in 1915
Andrew Jackson Donelson (1799–1871), American diplomat and his first cousin, Emily Donelson (1807–1836)

E
Albert Einstein (1879–1955), physicist, and his first cousin, Elsa Löwenthal née Einstein
William Crowninshield Endicott (1826–1900), former US Secretary of War, and his first cousin, Ellen Peabody
Ulises Espaillat (1823–1878), Dominican Republic liberal caudillo, and his first cousin Eloísa Espaillat

F
Viriato Fiallo, Dominican Republic dissident, and his first cousin Prudencia Fiallo, daughter of his uncle Fabio Fiallo
Vivian Fuchs (1908–1999), British explorer, and his cousin Joyce Connell

G
Carlo Gambino (1902–1976), a mob boss, and his first cousin, Catherine Castellano
Buddha Gautama and first cousin Yaśodharā
André Gide, Nobel Prize-winning French author, and his cousin Madeleine Rondeaux
Charlotte Perkins Gilman, American author, and her first cousin, George Houghton Gilman
Carl Giles, cartoonist, and his first cousin, Joan Giles
A. D. Gordon and his cousin, Faige Tartakov.
Samuel L. Gouverneur and his first cousin, Maria Hester Monroe
Laurent de Gouvion Saint-Cyr, French general and later Marshal of the Empire, and his first cousin, Anne Gouvion
Duncan Grant, Scottish painter, who was in a relationship with his male first cousin, the English writer Lytton Strachey.
Bibb Graves, and his first cousin, Dixie Bibb
Edvard Grieg, Norwegian composer, and his first cousin, lyric soprano Nina Hagerup (1845-1935)

H
Shaykh Haydar (1459-1488), leader of the Safavid order and his first cousin Alam-Shah Begum 
Friedrich Hayek, Austrian-British economist, and his cousin Helene Bitterlich
Alexander Herzen, Russian writer and political activist, and his cousin Natalya Zakharina
Mark Hopkins Jr., American railroad executive, and his first cousin, Mary Sherwood
Saddam Hussein (1937–2006), fifth President of Iraq, and his first cousin Sajida Talfah (b. 1937)

J
Jacob was married to two of his first cousins, sisters Leah and Rachel
Ja'far al-Sadiq (700 or 702 – 765), Muslim scholar, and his first cousin, Fatima bint al-Hussain'l-Athram bin al-Hasan bin Ali
Jesse James (1847–1882), American outlaw and guerilla, and his first cousin, Zerelda "Zee" Mimms (1845–1900)
Jón Sigurðsson (1811–1879), leader of the 19th-century Icelandic independence movement, and his first cousin, Ingibjörg Einarsdóttir

K
Naoto Kan (b. 1946), former Prime Minister of Japan, and his first cousin, Nobuko Himei (b. 1945), essayist
Nobusuke Kishi (1896–1987), former Japanese statesman, and his first cousin, Yoshiko Kishi
Natasha Klauss, Colombian actress, and her first cousin, Marcelo Greco
Kujō Michiie (1193–1252), Japanese regent, and his first cousin, Saionji Rinshi

L
David Lean, British film director, and his first cousin, Isabel Lean (his first wife)
Charles Lilburn Lewis and his first cousin, Lucy Jefferson Lewis
Li Ka-shing, founder of Cheung Kong Holdings, married his first cousin Chong Yuet Ming, who died in 1990
John Amory Lowell and his first cousin, Susan Cabot Lowell

M
Rob Roy MacGregor and his cousin Mary Helen MacGregor of Comar, who married in January 1693
Gerardo Machado, fifth president of Cuba, and his first cousin, Elvira Machado Nodal
Maeda Toshiie, Japanese Daimyō in the 15th century, and his first cousin, Matsu.
Nanaia Mahuta, Minister of Foreign Affairs (New Zealand), and her first cousin, William Gannin Ormsby
Delarivier Manley, British playwright and political satirist, and her first cousin John Manley
Francis Marion, American revolutionary leader also called the "Swamp Fox," and his first cousin, Mary Esther Videau
Humphrey Marshall and his first cousin, Anna Maria ("Mary") Marshall.
Abraham Maslow, father of humanistic psychology, and his first cousin, Bertha Goodman
John Minor Maury and his first cousins, Eliza Maury
Matthew Fontaine Maury married his first cousin, Ann Hull Herndon, sister of Captain William Lewis Herndon, who died on his ship SS Central America
Randolph "Randall" McCoy, patriarch of the McCoy clan involved in the Hatfield–McCoy feud, and his first cousin Sarah "Sally" McCoy
Darius Milhaud, French composer, and his first cousin Madeleine Milhaud
Christopher Robin Milne, son of author A. A. Milne who was the model for the character Christopher Robin of the Winnie-the-Pooh books, and his first cousin Lesley Sélincourt
Marina Mora, Peruvian beauty queen and former Miss Peru, and her first cousin Gustavo Mora 
Henry Morgan, Welsh privateer, and his first cousin Mary Morgan (daughter of his uncle Edward).
William Morgan (c. 1640 – 28 April 1680) and his first cousin, Blanche Morgan
Mōri Terumoto, Japanese Daimyo in late 15th and early 16th century, and his cousin (first wife), Minami no Kata.
Gouverneur Morris Jr. and his first cousin, Martha Jefferson Cary
Ignacy Mościcki, Polish chemist and president and his first cousin, Michalina Czyżewska 
Muhammad, Islamic prophet (c. 570 – 632) and his first cousin, Zaynab bint Jahsh

N
Naoe Kanetsugu (1559–1620), Japanese samurai and Karō of the Uesugi clan in 16th and 17th centuries, and his first cousin, Osen.
Sócrates Nolasco (1884–1980), Dominican Republic writer, and his first cousin Flérida Lamarche (1891–1976), who was a renowned pianist writer, and teacher.

O
Henry Ormsby, Irish lawyer, and his first cousin, Julia Hamilton
Ōtomo no Yakamochi (c. 718 – 785), Japanese statesman and waka poet in the Nara period, and his cousin, Sakanoue no Ōiratsume.

P
Ahmad Maher Pasha, Egyptian prime minister, and his first cousin, Ihsan Hanem Sami
Endicott Peabody (1857–1944) and his first cousin, Fannie Peabody.
Lars Hannibal Sommerfeldt Stoud Platou, Norwegian psychiatrist, and hid first cousin, Mimi Platou
Edgar Allan Poe and his first cousin, Virginia Clemm (1822–1847)
John J. Pettus (1813–1867), 23rd Governor of Mississippi, and his first cousin, Permelia Virginia Winston
Peter A. Porter (1827–1864), lawyer, politician and a Union Army colonel, and his first cousin, Mary Cabell Breckinridge
William Joseph Poupore, Canadian politician, and his first cousin, Eleonor Poupore
Sir Robert Price, 2nd Baronet, and his first cousin Mary Price

R
Sergei Rachmaninoff, composer, and his first cousin, Natalia Satina
Paul Ranson, French painter, and his first cousin, Marie-France Rousseau
Satyajit Ray, Indian film-maker, and his first cousin, Bijoya Ray
Jacques de Reinach, French banker, and his first cousin, Fanny Emden
Aubrey Robinson, Hawaiian planter, and his first cousin, Alice Gay
Hassan Rouhani (b. 1948), 7th president of Iran and his first cousin Sahebeh Rouhani née Arabi (b. 1954)
 
S
Greta Scacchi, actress of Presumed Innocent, and her first cousin, Carlo Mantegazza
Robert Sheldon, Baron Sheldon, and his first cousin, Eileen Shamash
George Simpson, Scottish colonial official, and his first cousin, Frances Ramsay Simpson
William Stith and his first cousin, Judith Randolph
Igor Stravinsky, composer, and his first cousin, Katerina Nossenko
Alexander Streatfeild-Moore, English cricketer, and his first cousin, Evelyn Agatha Gatyana Streatfeild

T
Edward Thornton Tayloe, American diplomat, and his first cousin, Mary Ogle
John Edward Taylor (1791–1844), 1821 founder of The Manchester Guardian (since 1959 The Guardian), in 1824 married his first cousin, Sophia Russell Scott.
Toyotomi Hideyori (1593-1615), Japanese daimyō, a son of Toyotomi Hideyoshi (1537-1598), and his first cousin Senhime (1597-1666)

U
Uthman Abu Quhafa (538 or 540 – 635), father of the first Rashidun Caliph, Abu Bakr and his first cousin, Salma Umm al-Khair (d. between 632 and 634)

V
Mario Vargas Llosa (b. 1936), Peruvian writer and 2010 Nobel laureate, and his first cousin Patricia Llosa

W
H. G. Wells (1866–1946), author, and his first cousin, Isabel Mary Wells (his first wife)
William Whipple (1730–1785), signer of the Declaration of Independence, and his first cousin, Catherine Moffatt
John A. Winston (1812–1871), 15th Governor of Alabama and his first cousin, Mary Agness Jones
Henry Winthrop (1608–1630), son of founder and Governor of the Massachusetts Bay Colony, and his first cousin Elizabeth Fones (1610 – c. 1673)

Y
Annie Henrietta Yule (1874–1950), film financier and breeder of Arab horses at Hanstead Stud in England, and her first cousin Sir David Yule, 1st Baronet (1858–1928), Scottish business based in British India

Royalty in Europe

Royalty outside Europe

Aristocracy

See also
 Avunculate marriage
 Consanguinity
 Cousin marriage
 Marriage

References

Co
Lists of families

Lists of couples